Michael Levine is an American developmental and cell biologist at Princeton University, where he is the Director of the Lewis-Sigler Institute for Integrative Genomics and a Professor of Molecular Biology.

Levine previously held appointments at the University of California, Berkeley, the University of California, San Diego, and Columbia University. He is notable for co-discovering the Homeobox in 1983 and for discovering the organization of the regulatory regions of developmental genes.

Biography
Levine was born in West Hollywood and raised in Los Angeles.  Levine studied biology as an undergraduate at UC Berkeley, studying biology with Allan Wilson and graduating in 1976. He went on to graduate studies at Yale, where he studied with Alan Garen and in 1981 received a Ph.D. in molecular biophysics and biochemistry.

Levine joined the Princeton faculty in 2015, and had been a professor at UC Berkeley after leaving UCSD in 1996.

Discoveries

Homeobox discovery 
Levine was a post-doc with Walter Gehring in Switzerland from 1982 to 1983.  There, he co-discovered the homeobox with Ernst Hafen and fellow post-doc William McGinnis:
After learning that Ultrabithorax, a gene that specifies the development of wings, showed a localized pattern of expression similar to that of Antennapedia, they decided to revisit the classic papers of Ed Lewis. In 1978, Lewis had proposed that all these homeotic genes (the ones that tell animals where to put a wing and where to put a leg and so on) arose from a common ancestral gene. So McGinnis carved up the Antennapedia gene and, using those pieces as probes, the trio identified eight genes, which turned out to be the eight homeotic genes in flies. "That pissed off a lot of people," says Levine. "The homeotic genes were the trophies of the Drosophila genome. And we got 'em all. I mean, we got 'em all!" Far from being humble, Levine says, "We were like, 'We kicked your ass pretty good, didn't we, baby!' Those were the days."

Discovery of the eve stripe 2 enhancer 
Levine briefly returned to UC Berkeley as a postdoctoral fellow with Gerry Rubin.  He then joined the faculty of Columbia University, where he "led the discovery of the modular organization of the regulatory regions of developmental genes."  After isolating the even-skipped (eve) gene, Levine's team determined that each of the seven stripes was produced by separate enhancers.  With further study they discovered that both a set of activators and a set of repressors worked together to shape the expression of eve in the second stripe, and determined that the repressors shut down only their binding enhancers, leaving other enhancers free of repression. Joseph Corbo said of the work, "Before Levine's studies of even-skipped stripe 2, it wasn't clear how you generated spatially restricted patterns of gene expression from initially broad crude gradients of morphogens.  I think that the even-skipped stripe 2 studies were the defining studies that showed how an organism can interpret those gradients and turn them into specific patterns of gene expression. To me that's Mike's crowning achievement."

Discoveries in the ascidian Ciona 
After earning tenure in only four years at Columbia, Levine moved to UCSD in 1991, where he added the sea squirt, Ciona intestinalis, to his repertoire.  Although much of Levine's work, including his homeobox studies, has been done in Drosophila Levine's team is also prominent in work with the sea squirt, Ciona intestinalis, an invertebrate that facilitates study of development. For example, this work included insights into classical myodeterminants and the composition of the notochord, the defining tissue of the chordate phylum.

Awards 
 1982 - Jane Coffin Childs Postdoctoral Fellowship
 1985 - Searle Scholars Research Fellowship
 1985 - Alfred P. Sloan Fellowship
 1996 - NAS Award in Molecular Biology - "For his insightful contributions to our understanding of gene regulation networks and molecular mechanisms governing the development of organisms with a segmented body plan."
 1998 - Elected to United States National Academy of Sciences in "Cellular and Developmental Biology" section: "Utilizing an elegant blend of in vitro and in vivo studies, Levine carried out insightful and complete analysis of regulatory events that govern segmentation and dorsal-ventral polarity in Drosophila. His work provided a dramatic example of combinatorial regulation at a complex enhancer and established new paradigms for transcriptional control."
 2009 - Wilbur Cross Medal (Yale Alumni Association)

Professional relations 

Levine cites as a significant influence his instructor Fred Wilt (taking his developmental biology class "was probably the single most galvanizing experience I had in terms of defining my future goals"), and cites fellow scientists Eric Davidson, Peter Lawrence and Christiane Nusslein-Volhard as "mentors [and] friends ... over the years".

On choosing to become a research biologist, he described some family pressure to become a doctor ("Coming from a modest background, particularly a Jewish family, the pressure to become a doctor was intense"),

Fellow biologist Sean Carroll said of Levine, "Mike's work has done for animal development what the work on the lac operon and phage lambda did for understanding gene regulation in simpler organisms ... [Those] two big discoveries had a very large conceptual significance for developmental biology and by extension for evolutionary biology."

Notable papers
 (the homeobox paper)

Notes

External links
 Levine Lab website

 Seminars and Talks
Michael Levine's Seminar Series: "Transcriptional Precision in the Drosophila Embryo"

 Interviews (print and video)
 Video interview with Levine, "Evolution: 'Great Transformations'" (WGBH 2001).
 Levine interviewed in "What Darwin Never Knew", PBS Nova, Dec. 21, 2011
 Video Interview with Levine by Andrea Anderson, "The Biology of Genomes (2008)", SciVee (April 8, 2009)

 Profiles

 "25 Years of Homeodomain / Homeobox discovery", Evo devo, HOX, May 10, 2008.

21st-century American biologists
Developmental biologists
University of California, Berkeley faculty
Members of the United States National Academy of Sciences
Jewish American scientists
Year of birth missing (living people)
Living people
21st-century American Jews